The Guaicamacuto-class patrol boats (Avante 1400) is a class of offshore patrol vessels or BVL in Venezuelan Navy service for patrol duty in economic exclusive zone. A contract for four BVLs and four POVZEE was signed together on 25 November 2005. Since 2014 the Spanish Anticorruption Prosecutor's Office has been investigating the €42m "commission" paid to some of those involved. 

The final vessel of the class was to have been named after Tamanaco, a 16th-century tribal leader, but in 2013 GC-24 was renamed Comandante eterno Hugo Chávez after the death of the then president. GC-24 was laid down in 2008 under the supervision of Navantia at the Venezuelan National Dams and Shipyards (DIANCA) in Puerto Cabello, was launched in 2014 and began sea trials in April 2018, but Navantia pulled out of Venezuela in January 2019 before trials were complete. 

Ships of classNaiguatá (GC-23) sunk after ramming the cruise ship RCGS Resolute on 30 March 2020 in an apparent attempt to seize it.

See also
 Viana do Castelo-class patrol vessel

References

External links
 Deagel BVL

Ships of the Bolivarian Navy of Venezuela